Coffins Grove Township is a township in Delaware County, Iowa, USA.  As of the 2000 census, its population was 615.

History
Coffins Grove Township (formerly Coffin's Grove with the apostrophe s) was organized in 1855. It is named for Clement Coffin, who settled in a forested grove about 15 years before.

Geography
Coffins Grove Township covers an area of 36.55 square miles (94.67 square kilometers). The stream of Prairie Creek runs through this township.

Cities and towns
 Masonville

Adjacent townships
 Richland Township (north)
 Honey Creek Township (northeast)
 Delaware Township (east)
 Prairie Township (south)
 Middlefield Township, Buchanan County (southwest)
 Fremont Township, Buchanan County (west)
 Madison Township, Buchanan County (northwest)

Cemeteries
The township contains three cemeteries: Coffins Grove, Greenwood and Saint Mary.

Airports and landing strips
 Manchester Municipal Airport

References
 U.S. Board on Geographic Names (GNIS)
 United States Census Bureau cartographic boundary files

External links
 US-Counties.com
 City-Data.com

Townships in Delaware County, Iowa
Townships in Iowa
1855 establishments in Iowa
Populated places established in 1855